There Never Was a Time is a studio album by American country music singer–songwriter Hank Locklin. It was released in 1977 via Plantation Records and contained ten tracks. It was Locklin's twenty fifth studio album released in his career and his only album for the Plantation label. The project spawned four singles released between 1976 and 1977.

Background and content
For nearly twenty years, Hank Locklin recorded with RCA Victor Records where he had his biggest commercial success and released multiple albums. In the early 1970s, he left the label and recorded for MGM Records and later signed with Plantation Records. Locklin recorded There Never Was a Time under the production of Shelby Singleton at his Nashville, Tennessee studio titled Singleton Sound Studio. It was Locklin's first time working with Singleton. The album contained a total of ten tracks. There Never Was a Time included re-recordings of Locklin's previous hits for RCA: "Happy Journey" and "We're Gonna Go Fishin'." Several new tracks were also included, such as the self-penned track "Baby, I Need You." Another new recording, "You Love Me, Don'cha," was composed by Plantation recording artist Jeannie C. Riley. Webb Pierce also contributed to the track "Night Life Queen."

Release and singles
There Never Was a Time was released in 1977 via Plantation Records. It was originally distributed as a vinyl LP, with five songs on each side of the record. It was later reissued in a digital format to several online music retailers, including Apple Music. There Never Was a Time spawned a total of three singles between 1976 and 1977. Its first single was issued in February 1976 via Plantation: "Baby I Need You." In July 1976, "Daytime Love Affair" was released as the album's second single. In November 1976, "You Love Me, Don'cha" was released as the album's third single. The title track was issued as the album's final single release in July 1977.

Track listings

Vinyl version

Digital version

Personnel
All credits are adapted from the liner notes of There Never Was a Time.

Musical and technical personnel
 Gayle Allen – Back cover artist
 Betty Cherry – Cover artist
 LeRoy Duncan – Engineer
 Hank Locklin – Lead vocals
 John Singleton – Photography
 Shelby Singleton – Producer

Release history

References

1977 albums
Albums produced by Shelby Singleton
Hank Locklin albums
Plantation Records albums